Wagon Wheels Westward is a 1945 American Western film in the Red Ryder film series directed by R. G. Springsteen and written by Earle Snell. The film stars Wild Bill Elliott, Robert Blake, Alice Fleming, Linda Stirling, Roy Barcroft and Emmett Lynn. The film was released on December 21, 1945, by Republic Pictures.

Plot

Cast  
Wild Bill Elliott as Red Ryder
Robert Blake as Little Beaver 
Alice Fleming as Martha 'The Duchess' Wentworth
Linda Stirling as Arlie Adams
Roy Barcroft as Dave McKean Posing as John Larkin
Emmett Lynn as Pop Dale
Dick Curtis as Henchman Tuttle
Jay Kirby as Bob Adams
George J. Lewis as Lunsford
Bud Geary as Fake Sheriff Jeff Brown
Tom London as Fake Judge James E. Worth
Kenne Duncan as Henchman Joe
George Chesebro as Henchman Butch Posing as Tom Sutton

References

External links 
 

1945 films
American Western (genre) films
1945 Western (genre) films
Republic Pictures films
Films directed by R. G. Springsteen
Films based on comic strips
Films based on American comics
Films set in ghost towns
American black-and-white films
1940s English-language films
1940s American films
Red Ryder films